Dolk can refer to:

 Dolichol kinase, an enzyme
 DOLK, a Norwegian urban artist